The 31st Golden Horse Awards (Mandarin:第31屆金馬獎) took place on December 10, 1994, at Sun Yat-sen Memorial Hall in Taipei, Taiwan.

References

31st
1994 film awards
1994 in Taiwan